Wołyńce may refer to the following places:
Wołyńce, Masovian Voivodeship (east-central Poland)
Wołyńce, Sejny County in Podlaskie Voivodeship (north-east Poland)
Wołyńce, Sokółka County in Podlaskie Voivodeship (north-east Poland)